Jerry Voutilainen (born 29 March 1995) is a Finnish football player. He plays for FC Honka.

Career
He made his Veikkausliiga debut for KuPS on 12 September, 2011, in a game against HJK.

After playing five seasons with VPS, it was confirmed on 13 November 2019, that Voutilainen would join FC Honka from the 2020 season, signing a deal until the end of the year.

References

External links
 

1995 births
People from Kuopio
Living people
Finnish footballers
Finland youth international footballers
Finland under-21 international footballers
Kuopion Palloseura players
Vaasan Palloseura players
FC Honka players
Veikkausliiga players
Association football midfielders
Sportspeople from North Savo